Nancy J. Stoyer is an American chemist.
She was part of the team that discovered the 113 through 118 elements.

Life 
Stoyer graduated from California State University, Stanislaus in 1988 with a B.S. in Chemistry. She obtained her PhD in Chemistry from UC Berkeley in 1995.

Career 
Following her PhD, Stoyer worked at Lawrence Livermore National Laboratory until 2008, where she was involved in the discoveries of superheavy elements 113-118.

She is on the board of the Pedrozzi Scholarship Foundation.

Scientific discoveries 
Stoyer was part of the team of scientists at Lawrence Livermore National Laboratory that discovered and verified the existence of superheavy elements 113 (Nihonium), 115 (Moscovium) 116 (Livermorium), and 118 (Oganesson). When element 114 (Flerovium) was synthesised in 1998 at Flerov Laboratory of Nuclear Reactions of the Joint Institute for Nuclear Research in Dubna, Russia, scientists at Livermore helped to confirm their discovery by assisting with independent analysis of their data. Stoyer generated a search code to search through the experimental data for decay sequences similar to the 114-289 decay sequence that had already been observed experimentally. This analysis was used to confirm that Flerovium had actually been made and detected.

References

External links 

 Catalyst Magazine

Year of birth missing (living people)
Living people
American women chemists
21st-century American chemists
California State University, Stanislaus alumni
21st-century American women scientists